Chris Vrenna (born February 23, 1967 in Erie, Pennsylvania) is an American musician, producer, engineer, remixer, songwriter, programmer, and founder of the electronic band Tweaker. Vrenna played drums for the industrial rock band Nine Inch Nails from 1989 until 1997, and was the keyboardist and drummer of the American rock band Marilyn Manson from 2004 until late 2011.

As a member of Nine Inch Nails, Vrenna was inducted into the Rock & Roll Hall of Fame in 2020.

Career
Vrenna is a native of Erie, Pennsylvania. He graduated from McDowell High School in Erie, Pennsylvania in 1985 and marched in the Erie Thunderbirds Drum and Bugle Corps. Vrenna then moved to Chicago, quickly becoming a part of the Chicago industrial music scene and was briefly a member of Die Warzau and Stabbing Westward.

He later reconnected with Trent Reznor, whom he met during high school in Pennsylvania, when they both were in local Cleveland, Ohio band the Exotic Birds. He also toured as a live drummer for KMFDM during the Money era tours, in 1992. He records under the name Tweaker, and has released four albums under that name: The Attraction to All Things Uncertain (2001), 2 a.m. Wakeup Call (2004), Call The Time Eternity (2012), and And Then There's Nothing (2013). Tweaker toured select North American dates with Skinny Puppy in 2004.

As producer, remixer, or engineer Vrenna has worked with The Smashing Pumpkins, U2, Nine Inch Nails, Skinny Puppy, Gary Numan, Scar the Martyr, David Sylvian, Mudvayne, Lords of Acid, God Lives Underwater, Megadeth, Rammstein, Metallica, The Rasmus, Weezer, P.O.D., David Bowie, Slipknot, Cold, underwater, Scarling., Hole, Marilyn Manson, Rob Zombie, Green Day, Bush, Live, Adema, the Wallflowers, Dir en grey, Psyclon Nine, and others. He has also worked with the industrial group Pigface and produced songs and albums for underground girl groups TCR, Jack Off Jill, and Rasputina.

Vrenna has also worked on music for several video games, including Call of Duty: Advanced Warfare, Doom 3 (as producer with Clint Walsh), Quake 4, American McGee's Alice, its sequel Alice: Madness Returns, Enter the Matrix, Sonic The Hedgehog, Area 51, and Need for Speed: Most Wanted. In 2004, he started soundtrack work on Tabula Rasa, a massive multiplayer online game. He also helped compose the theme song to the animated series Xiaolin Showdown.

He can be seen performing in the music videos for the songs "Down in It", "Head Like a Hole", "Gave Up", "Wish", "The Perfect Drug" and "March of the Pigs" on the Nine Inch Nails video compilation Closure.

Vrenna won a Grammy award as a member of Nine Inch Nails for "Best Metal Performance" for "Happiness in Slavery" in 1995 for the live performance of the song on Woodstock '94.

Vrenna was Billy Corgan's programmer for four months in 1997. While he was on tour with the Smashing Pumpkins, Vrenna got a call from Axl Rose, who invited Vrenna to spend time with Guns N' Roses to work on what would become Chinese Democracy. "I did for a couple weeks, but then decided I didn't want to join the band", said Vrenna. Vrenna stated in a later interview that he was in the band for several months before dropping out due to the required time commitment.

Vrenna was chosen to take over the drumming responsibilities for Marilyn Manson after Ginger Fish was injured in 2004 during the Lest We Forget tour. He then replaced Madonna Wayne Gacy as the permanent keyboardist for Marilyn Manson. Vrenna co-produced the albums The High End of Low (2009) and Born Villain (2012). In April 2011, following the departure of Marilyn Manson's drummer Ginger Fish, Chris Vrenna was announced to be his official replacement. However, in November 2011, it was announced that Vrenna had parted ways with the band in order to focus on scoring movies and video games.

In 2015, Vrenna composed the music on a series of downloadable content packs called Exo Zombies for Call of Duty: Advanced Warfare.

In 2017, it was announced by Vrenna's Facebook page that he would be composing music for the upcoming video game, Quake Champions, which marks his second collaboration with id Software since Doom 3.

Vrenna earned his master's degree in music technology in 2020. He's been a college instructor of music technology since 2013.

In 2020 Vrenna was inducted into the Rock & Roll Hall of Fame alongside members of Nine Inch Nails.

Discography

Solo

Instrumental contributions

Soundtracks

Remixes

With Tweaker

 The Attraction to All Things Uncertain (2001)
 2 a.m. Wakeup Call (2004)
 Call the Time Eternity (2012)

References

External links
Tweaker

20th-century American drummers
American heavy metal drummers
American heavy metal musicians
American industrial musicians
American male drummers
American people of Italian descent
Exotic Birds members
Grammy Award winners
Guns N' Roses members
Industrial metal musicians
Jack Off Jill members
Living people
Marilyn Manson (band) members
Nine Inch Nails members
Musicians from Erie, Pennsylvania
Pigface members
Stabbing Westward members
Steampunk music
Six Degrees Records artists
Video game composers
1967 births